The Savannah Historic District is a large urban U.S. historic district that roughly corresponds to the city limits of Savannah, Georgia, prior to the American Civil War.  The area was declared a National Historic Landmark District in 1966, and is one of the largest districts of its kind in the United States.  The district was made in recognition of the unique layout of the city, begun by James Oglethorpe at the city's founding and propagated for over a century of its growth.

It is bounded by the Savannah River on the north, Martin Luther King Jr. Boulevard on the west, Gwinnett Street and Forsyth Park on the south, and East Broad Street and Trustees' Garden on the east.

Below is an incomplete list of relevant buildings inside Savannah Historic District:

Selected contributing properties

See also
List of historic houses and buildings in Savannah, Georgia
Historic Savannah Foundation

References

National Register of Historic Places in Savannah, Georgia
Buildings and structures in Savannah, Georgia